Pristimantis repens, known commonly as the Galeras robber frog, is a species of frog in the family Strabomantidae. It is endemic to the Colombian Massif in the Nariño Department, Colombia. The specific name repens is Latin for creeping or crawling, inferred to be its mode of locomotion based on its short limbs.

Description
Adult males measure  and adult females  in snout–vent length. The snout is rounded. The tympanum is visible with a distinct annulus. All toes and all but the innermost finger bear small discs; no lateral keels nor webbing are present. The dorsal skin is shagreened anteriorly, turning tuberculate posteriorly and granular laterally. The dorsum is brown or olive with dark brown marking. The lower surfaces are olive-brown. The groin and other concealed surfaces of the limbs are pale red. The lips have white lines.

Habitat and conservation
Specimens have been found under rocks or inside the sparse páramo vegetation. Breeding is by direct development (i.e., there is no free-living larval stage).

Pristimantis repens was common at its type locality, the Galeras volcano. The area has little human activity, but the population could be threatened by the eruption of this active volcano. Galeras is designated as a Fauna and Flora Sanctuary.

References

repens
Amphibians of the Andes
Amphibians of Colombia
Endemic fauna of Colombia
Amphibians described in 1984
Taxa named by John Douglas Lynch
Taxonomy articles created by Polbot